Prospero Castillo Nograles (October 30, 1947 – May 4, 2019) also called "Boy Nograles," was a Filipino politician who served as the Speaker of the House of Representatives from 2008 to 2010. He was the first Speaker from Mindanao in a hundred years of Philippine legislative history. From 1989 to 2010, he was elected to five non-consecutive terms as a member of the House of Representatives, representing Davao City's 1st congressional district.

Early life
Nograles was born in Davao City, and finished his elementary and secondary education at the Ateneo de Davao University. He then studied at the Ateneo de Manila University, obtaining his Bachelor of Arts Degree major in Political Science in 1967, and his Bachelor of Laws degree from the Ateneo de Manila Law School in 1971. He placed second in the 1971 bar examinations with an average of 90.95%.

Political career
Nograles was active in the political opposition against President Ferdinand Marcos. He was involved in the litigation of human rights cases during that period, and was an active campaigner for Corazon Aquino during the 1986 snap presidential elections. After Aquino assumed the presidency, Nograles sought a seat in the House of Representatives, representing the 1st district of Davao City. Although his opponent Jesus Dureza was initially proclaimed as winner, Nograles was seated in the House in 1989 following a favorable decision of the House Electoral Tribunal. He gave up his House seat in 1992 to make an unsuccessful challenge to the re-election of Davao City Mayor Rodrigo Duterte, In 1998, Nograles again gave up his House seat to make another unsuccessful bid for election as Davao City mayor against Duterte-backed Benjamin de Guzman and lost in his bid. He again won election to the House in 2001. In the 2004 and 2007 elections, Nograles ran unopposed for two consecutive terms. In 2008 to 2010, he served as a House Speaker during the administration of then-President Gloria Macapagal Arroyo.

In his stay in Congress, Nograles was able to author 17 House bills and co-authored 85. He chaired the Special Committee on Law Enforcement and its subcommittee on Gambling, Committee on Housing and Urban Development, and the Committee on Rules.

House Speaker
In early 2008, several members of Congress dissatisfied with the leadership of House Speaker Jose de Venecia expressed support for Nograles as the new Speaker. Shortly after midnight, February 5, 2008, the House of Representatives approved a motion to declare the position of House Speaker as vacant. Several minutes later, de Venecia nominated Nograles to be his replacement. Nograles was immediately elected as Speaker after no other representative was nominated to the post and no objection was posed to his election.

2010 mayoralty bid
He ran again for the mayorship of Davao City in 2010, where he would lose this time to Vice-Mayor Sara Duterte, daughter of then-mayor and now President Rodrigo Duterte who ran for vice-mayor. After 30 years of rivalry between Nograles and Duterte, they eventually reconciled on November 27, 2015, when Nograles supported the 2016 presidential bid of then-city Mayor Duterte.

Post-Congress
On September 15, 2016, it was reported that Nograles's bodyguards were killed by the Davao Death Squad (DDS) when he ran for mayor against now-President Duterte in 2010, whom they were rival at the time. Nograles denied the claim. However, a confessed DDS member named Edgar Matobato said that the group has kidnapped and killed four supporters of Nograles Island Garden City of Samal, Davao del Norte upon the orders of then-mayor Duterte.

On March 7, 2017, Nograles faced charges of "graft and malversation" filed by the Ombudsman for allegedly misusing of pork barrel funds for "ghost projects" when he was caretaker of Misamis Oriental. The investigation by the Ombudsman showed that the Department of Budget and Management has released  of Priority Development Assistance Fund (PDAF) for the various projects and "bogus" foundations.

Death 
Nograles died on May 4, 2019. According to the report of ABS-CBN News, Karlo Nograles said that his father succumbed to "respiratory failure, secondary to pneumonia". His remains were flown to Davao on May 7. President Rodrigo Duterte expressed his condolences to the family of Nograles. On May 13, his remains were buried at Forest Lake - San Pedro Memorial Park in Davao City.

Notes

External links
Official website of Speaker Prospero Nograles

|-

1947 births
2019 deaths
Visayan people
People from Davao City
20th-century Filipino lawyers
Speakers of the House of Representatives of the Philippines
Members of the House of Representatives of the Philippines from Davao City
Ateneo de Manila University alumni
Lakas–CMD (1991) politicians
Lakas–CMD politicians
Majority leaders of the House of Representatives of the Philippines